Cacoscelis nigripennis is a species of flea beetle in the family Chrysomelidae. It was first described by Martin Jacoby.

Description 
Adults have a black body, bright red head and thorax. They are usually 10 mm long and range between 5 mm and 4 mm wide.

Host plants 
They are well known for feeding on Passiflora caerulea, being one of the main problems for the plant when they are in large groups.

Distribution 
Cacoscelis nigripennis inhabit mainly in South America although, they are also present in Mexico.

See also
Aulacophora nigripennis, a species of leaf beetle in the genus Aulacophora

References 

Alticini